West Branch Christina River is a  second-order tributary to the Christina River in New Castle County, Delaware in the United States.

Variant name
According to the Geographic Names Information System, it has also been known historically as Persimmon Branch.

Course

West Branch Christina River rises on the Big Elk Creek and Christina River divides in Cecil County, Maryland and flows south then east into New Castle County, Delaware meet the Christina River at Newark, Delaware.

Watershed
West Branch Christina River drains  of area, receives about 46.2 in/year of precipitation, has a topographic wetness index of 488.40 and is about 25.1% forested.

See also
 List of Delaware rivers

Maps

References

Rivers of Delaware
Rivers of Maryland
Rivers of New Castle County, Delaware
Rivers of Cecil County, Maryland
Tributaries of the Christina River